Luis Olivera (24 October 1998) is an Argentine footballer who plays Atenas of Uruguay's Uruguayan Segunda División.

Club career 
Olivera is a youth exponent from River Plate. He made his league debut on 8 November 2015 against Newell's Old Boys.

On 3 January 2019, Olivera was loaned out to Uruguayan Primera División club Club Atlético River Plate in Montevideo for the 2019 season.

On 10 September 2019, Olivera was loaned to Swope Park Rangers in the USL Championship, after signing with Uruguayan club Atenas de San Carlos that summer. After one appearance, Olivera's loan expired and he returned to Atenas.

References

External links

1998 births
Living people
Argentine footballers
Association football defenders
Argentine Primera División players
Uruguayan Primera División players
Club Atlético River Plate footballers
San Martín de San Juan footballers
Argentina youth international footballers
Sporting Kansas City II players
USL Championship players